Măceșu may refer to several places in Romania:

Măceșu, a village in Târgu Cărbunești town, Gorj County
Măceșu de Jos, a commune in Dolj County
Măceșu de Sus, a commune in Dolj County